Colin Foster (born 16 July 1964) is an English retired football defender.

Career
Starting out at non-League club Elmstead, Foster made his league debut for Leyton Orient in January 1982 whilst still an apprentice. He moved to Nottingham Forest, for a fee of £50,000 in May 1987, making 72 league appearances under manager, Brian Clough.
In September 1989, he became manager Lou Macari's second and most expensive signing for West Ham United for £750,000. Never a regular player under Macari, he became so under new manager Billy Bonds in  a team which won promotion from the second division in season 1990-91. Foster's time at West Ham is most often associated with scoring a spectacular mid-air volley in an FA Cup Quarter Final versus Everton in March 1991. Everton were in the upper reaches of the First Division (then the top tier) while West Ham were a second-tier side. West Ham won the match 2-1  before being knocked out in the semi finals by Foster's old club Nottingham Forest.
Three seasons broken by regular injury followed and after a projected £400,000 move back to Nottingham Forest fell through, when Foster could not agree terms, he remained at West Ham on a weekly contract. A loan to Notts County followed before he eventually moved, for a fee of £100,000, to Watford in March 1994.

References

External links

SportingHeroes.net
Since 1888... The Searchable Premiership and Football League Player Database (subscription required)
Wonderful World of West Ham United statistics

1964 births
Living people
People from Chislehurst
English footballers
Association football defenders
Premier League players
English Football League players
F.C. Elmstead players
Leyton Orient F.C. players
Nottingham Forest F.C. players
West Ham United F.C. players
Notts County F.C. players
Watford F.C. players
Cambridge United F.C. players